The Grand Trunk station was a historic railroad station in Hamilton, Ontario, which was located on Stuart Street, at the beginning of Caroline Street North.

In 1885, an effort was made to beautify the area to the east of the station itself with ornamental gardens. The embankment along Stuart Street provided an opportunity to let passengers passing by to know exactly what city they were in, with the word "Hamilton" written with white stones.

Michael Willson Browne, one of the pioneers of the shipping industry in Hamilton, moved to Hamilton in 1836, and entered into a partnership with Daniel Charles Gunn, who retired in 1847. Mr. Browne became manager of the Grand Trunk Railway's office in Hamilton in 1864.

See also

Hamilton CNR Station
James Street North GO Station

References

External links

Railway stations in Canada opened in 1856
Hamilton, Ontario
Railway stations in Hamilton, Ontario
Railway stations closed in 1931
Demolished buildings and structures in Ontario